The Olivine River is a river in northern Fiordland, New Zealand. It rises north of the Cow Saddle and flows north, then north-west over Olivine Falls to become a tributary of the Pyke River near Olivine Hut. The Five Passes hiking (tramping) trail passes through the upper river near Cow Saddle. The Dun Mountain Ophiolite Belt which is rich in the mineral olivine outcrops extensively in the Olivine River and its tributaries.

See also
List of rivers of New Zealand

References

Rivers of Fiordland